Martin Rasmussen Hjelmen (24 January 1904 – 30 May 1944) was a Norwegian sailor and communist activist.

He was from Øygarden, born in Herdla. He went to work at sea from the age of fifteen, and was based in Australia in the 1920s. Upon returning to Norway he settled in Ski.

He chaired the Norwegian branch of the Wollweber League from 1936 to 1938. He was arrested in Sweden in February 1940, and later handed over to the Gestapo. He was sentenced to death and executed in Brandenburg in May 1944.

He was the first leader of the Osvald Group, until he in 1938 transferred to Saborg in Bergen.

References

1904 births
1944 deaths
People from Hordaland
People from Øygarden
Norwegian sailors
Norwegian expatriates in Australia
Norwegian communists
Norwegian anti-fascists
Norwegian prisoners and detainees
Prisoners and detainees of Sweden
People extradited from Sweden
People extradited to Germany
Norwegian people executed by Nazi Germany
Norwegian people executed abroad